Charles Albert Pell (October 1, 1874 – January 26, 1936) was an American college football coach from 1902 until 1907.

Coaching career

Northern Iowa
Pell got his first head coaching job at Northern Iowa in 1902 and coached there through the 1905 season. His record at Northern Iowa was 15–15–5.

Drake
Pell was the ninth head football coach at Drake University in Des Moines, Iowa and he held that position for two seasons, from 1906 until 1907. His record at Drake was 5–8–2.

Head coaching record

Football

References

External links
 

1874 births
1936 deaths
Drake Bulldogs athletic directors
Drake Bulldogs football coaches
Drake Bulldogs men's basketball coaches
Northern Iowa Panthers baseball coaches
Northern Iowa Panthers football coaches
Northern Iowa Panthers men's basketball coaches